The Loren Towle Estate is a historic estate at 785 Centre Street in Newton, Massachusetts, USA.

The estate's construction began in 1920 for real estate executive Loren D. Towle as a 35-room, Gothic-style English Revival mansion with formal gardens, terraces, tennis courts, and garage.  Design of the estate buildings was by Arthur W. Bowditch, and landscaping design was provided by the Olmsted Brothers firm.  Towle died in 1924, before the mansion was completed.  In December 1925 it became home to the Newton Country Day School, and in 1990 it was added to the National Register of Historic Places.

See also
 National Register of Historic Places listings in Newton, Massachusetts

References

 Wicked Local article

Houses on the National Register of Historic Places in Newton, Massachusetts
Houses completed in 1920
Tudor Revival architecture in Massachusetts